Help Rescue The Planet is an educational charity dedicated to minimising air pollution and mitigating climate change.  In 2012 it organised the St George's House Consultations in Windsor and The International Conference on Climate Change in London.  Trustees include Dr Robin Russell-Jones, Dr Charles Tannock, MEP and Baroness Walmsley.

References

External links
 

Educational charities based in the United Kingdom
Climate change organisations based in the United Kingdom
Environmental charities based in the United Kingdom
Environmental organizations established in 2011